Nieuwerkerk is a village in the Dutch province of Zeeland. It is a part of the municipality of Schouwen-Duiveland, and lies about 23 km south of Hellevoetsluis.

Nieuwerkerk was a separate municipality until 1961, when the new municipality of Duiveland was created.

History 
Nieuwerkerk was created in the 12th century. It was a split-off from Ouwerkerk. The fifteenth-century Protestant church, originally dedicated to John (evangelist), has an 6 sided tower. It was rebuilt in 1975 on the foundations of the original tower, which was blown up in 1945 by the Germans.

During the North Sea flood of 1953, approximately 265 of the 1,800 residents drowned or went missing.

Churches 
There are 4 church congregations in Nieuwerkerk:

 Reformed Church, the church is in the Molenstraat.
 Reformed Church in the Netherlands, this church is in the Stationstraat.
 Hersteld Hervormde Kerk, this church is in the Ooststraat.
 Protestantse Kerk, this church is in the  Kerkring.

In the Molenstraat is a small church for the Katholieke Apostolische Gemeente. However, this church is almost never used.

Gallery

References

External links

Schouwen-Duiveland
History of Schouwen-Duiveland
Populated places in Zeeland
Former municipalities of Zeeland